Croatia–Slovakia relations are foreign relations between Croatia and Slovakia. Croatia has an embassy in Bratislava. Slovakia has an embassy in Zagreb and honorary consulates in Osijek and Split.

Both countries are full members of the European Union and NATO.

Country comparison

History 
Czechoslovakia recognized Croatia on 16 January 1992. After dissolution of Czechoslovakia, Croatia and newly established Slovakia mutually recognized and established diplomatic relations on 1 January 1993.

See also 
 Foreign relations of Croatia
 Foreign relations of Slovakia
 Czechoslovakia–Yugoslavia relations

References

External links
 Embassy of Croatia in Slovakia 

 
Slovakia
Bilateral relations of Slovakia